Cereibacter is a genus of bacteria from the family of Rhodobacteraceae . Cereibacter changlensis has been isolated from snow from the Changla Pass in the Himalayas.

References

Rhodobacteraceae
Bacteria genera